Stanley Arthur Wall (born June 16, 1951) is a former pitcher in Major League Baseball. He pitched in 66 games for the Los Angeles Dodgers from 1975 to 1977.

External links

1951 births
Living people
Los Angeles Dodgers players
Ogden Dodgers players
Albuquerque Dodgers players
Daytona Beach Dodgers players
Waterbury Dodgers players
Albuquerque Dukes players
Major League Baseball pitchers
Baseball players from Missouri
People from Butler, Missouri